Oppression is the negative outcome experienced by people targeted by the cruel exercise of power in a society or social group.

Oppression may also refer to:

 Oppression (album), by Incite, 2016
 "Oppression", a song by Ben Harper from Fight for Your Mind
 Oppression remedy, a concept in corporate law